Daxing Township is a township under the administration of Nanpiao District, Huludao, Liaoning, China. , it has 12 villages under its administration.

References 

Township-level divisions of Liaoning
Huludao